James Chatterton may refer to:

Jim Chatterton (1864–1944), baseball player
Sir James Chatterton, 1st Baronet (died 1806), MP for Baltimore and Doneraile, Ireland
Sir James Chatterton, 3rd Baronet of the Chatterton baronets
James Chatterton (cricketer) (1836–1891), British cricketer
James Charles Chatterton (1794–1874), British Army officer and politician

See also
Chatterton (disambiguation)